De'Mario Monte Thornton (born June 13, 1985), known as Raz-B, is an American singer and  actor, who was a founding member of R&B boy band B2K.

Career
Born in Cleveland, Ohio, Raz B was a creator and member of the group B2K as a teen. During his time in the group, B2K released their album, Pandemonium!, and performed on an accompanying tour.  The group’s first feature film, You Got Served, was released in 2004, shortly before they announced their break-up.

Distributed through his own production company, RazBeatz Entertainment, Raz released his first single, Fire, in May 2007. Fire officially debuted on the Billboard charts (the week of 5/12/07). Landing a spot on the Hot R&B/Hip-Hop Singles Sales chart and debuting at #2, it also hit the Billboard Hot Singles Sales chart at #2.  There was no promotion behind the single as it debuted, because Raz B was pushing his music on an independent level.

On March 19, 2010, Raz B released his first mixtape titled Boy 2 King. In 2011, Elayne Rivers, Raz B's longtime publicist, announced that he would be going on tour in China. Throughout the tour, Raz B performed shows in various parts of China.

On August 19, 2013, during a performance in Zhejiang province, Raz B tried to stop a fight in the audience and was hit in the face with a glass bottle.  Initial reports were that he had fallen into a coma, but subsequent reports were that this was misinformation, labelled as a hoax, and that he would make a full recovery.

Albums with B2K

Singles with B2K

*In the beginning of 2008, a song titled Body Up was leaked; Raz-B leads this song with B2K members J-Boog & Lil' Fizz. Omarion did not take part in the group's return.

Discography as solo artist

*Boy 2 King: The Mixtape EP. Released: March 19, 2010  (digital download)
Paradox-EP. Released March 20, 2012.

Filmography

References

External links
 
 

1985 births
Living people
African-American male  singer-songwriters
African-American male dancers
American male film actors
American contemporary R&B singers
B2K members
African-American male actors
Musicians from Cleveland
Record producers from Ohio
Singer-songwriters from Ohio
21st-century African-American male singers